Circle-Vision 360° is a film format developed by The Walt Disney Company that uses projection screens which encircle the audience. 

Circle-Vision 360° developed from the Circarama format, which uses eleven 16 mm projectors. The first Circarama film was A Tour of the West (1955). For the movie Italia '61, the number of cameras was reduced to nine, and the 16 mm film was shown using 35 mm projectors. In 1965, Circle-Vision 360° made its official debut, in a nine-camera, 35 mm format. At least one reason for the renaming from Circarama was objections by the owners of Cinerama to the similarity between the two names. 

In both the Circarama and Circle-Vision 360° formats, the screens are arranged in a circle around the audience, with small gaps between the screens. The number of screens (eleven or nine) being odd results in a gap being opposite of each screen in the circle. The projectors are placed in these gaps, above the heads of the viewers. Railings are sometimes provided to steady the audience members while viewing the film. The cameras and projection systems for both Circarama and Circle-Vision 360° were designed by longtime Disney animator and visual effects pioneer Ub Iwerks. Circle-Vision 360° cameras have been mounted on top of automobiles for travelog scenes. For The Timekeeper (1992), static cameras and CGI effects were used.

At one time, every one of the Disney Resorts then open had at least one Circle-Vision 360° theater. The Epcot theme park has the only two still operating as of 2022. Circarama and Circle-Vision 360° films have also been featured at various world's fairs.

Circarama and Circle-Vision 360° films
A Tour of the West and the original 1958 version of America the Beautiful were shot in Circarama. Italia '61 was filmed in 16 mm and billed as a Circarama movie, but was shown using nine 35 mm projectors. All other films in the table were shot in Circle-Vision 360°. 

Sources:

Circarama and Circle-Vision 360° theaters
The theaters at Expo 58 and Disneyland were built as Circarama theaters. The latter would be upgraded to the Circle-Vision 360° system. Although the theater at Expo 61 predated the use of the Circle-Vision 360° name, it used nine 35 mm projectors. All other theaters in the tables were built as Circle-Vision 360° theaters.

Disney theme parks
Years in parentheses after a film title indicate the versions of the movie shown at the theater.

Expos

See also 

 List of film formats
 Cinéorama
 Bell Canada Pavilion (Expo 67)

Note

References

Walt Disney Parks and Resorts attractions
Epcot
Motion picture film formats
Tomorrowland
Multi-screen film
Panoramic cameras